In the mathematical branch of moonshine theory, a supersingular prime is a prime number that divides the order of the Monster group M, which is the largest sporadic simple group.  There are precisely fifteen supersingular prime numbers: the first eleven primes (2, 3, 5, 7, 11, 13, 17, 19, 23, 29, and 31), as well as 41, 47, 59, and 71. 

The non-supersingular primes are 37, 43, 53, 61, 67, and any prime number greater than or equal to 73.

Supersingular primes are related to the notion of supersingular elliptic curves as follows. For a prime number p, the following are equivalent:

 The modular curve X0+(p) = X0(p) / wp, where wp is the Fricke involution of X0(p), has genus zero.  
 Every supersingular elliptic curve in characteristic p can be defined over the prime subfield Fp.
 The order of the Monster group is divisible by p.

The equivalence is due to Andrew Ogg. More precisely, in 1975 Ogg showed that the primes satisfying the first condition are exactly the 15 supersingular primes listed above and shortly thereafter learned of the (then conjectural) existence of a sporadic simple group having exactly these primes as prime divisors.  This strange coincidence was the beginning of the theory of monstrous moonshine.

Three non-supersingular primes occur in the orders of two other sporadic simple groups: 37 and 67 divide the order of the Lyons group, and 37 and 43 divide the order of the fourth Janko group. It immediately follows that these two are not subquotients of the Monster group (they are two of the six pariah groups). The rest of the sporadic groups (including the other four pariahs, and also the Tits group, if that is counted among the sporadics) have orders with only supersingular prime divisors. In fact,  other than the Baby Monster group, they all have orders divisible only by primes less than or equal to 31, although no single sporadic group, other than the Monster itself, has all of them as prime divisors. The supersingular prime 47 also divides the order of the Baby Monster group, and the other three supersingular primes (41, 59, and 71) do not divide the order of any sporadic group other than the Monster itself.

All supersingular primes are Chen primes, but 37, 53, and 67 are also Chen primes, and there are infinitely many Chen primes greater than 73.

References 

 
 

Classes of prime numbers
Moonshine theory
Sporadic groups

fr:Nombre premier super-singulier
it:Primi supersingolari